"Coffee Talk" is a series of sketches performed by Mike Myers on the sketch comedy show Saturday Night Live. It ran from October 12, 1991, until October 15, 1994, although Myers (who had since left the show) reprised the role once more on March 22, 1997.

In the sketches, Myers plays a stereotypical Jewish middle-aged woman with an exaggerated New York accent who sports long, painted fake nails; much gold jewelry; gaudy sweaters; large dark glasses; and big hair, which she constantly adjusts. This character was a spoof on Myers' real-life mother-in-law at the time, Linda Richman.

Paul Baldwin period
Introduced on the January 12, 1991, episode, this sketch was originally called "Coffee Talk with Paul Baldwin", with Baldwin played by Mike Myers. The main joke was the use of as many words that accentuated the stereotypical New York accent as possible, particularly the low back chain shift that changes the vowels in words like "dogs, daughters, lofts and coffee" as Baldwin describes the show's preferred topics.

Starting with the October 12, 1991, episode, Paul Baldwin was written out and replaced with the character of Richman as the substitute host. In subsequent episodes, Richman explains that Baldwin is a good friend of hers and is recuperating in Boca Raton, Florida, because "he developed shpilkis in his genechtagazoink".

Ongoing gags

Streisand fixation
Richman's hero was Barbra Streisand. She constantly "dedicated" the show to her, often claiming her to be the greatest actress in all of history.

In what could be considered to be the sketch's most memorable moment, Myers was joined on February 22, 1992, by special guests Madonna and Roseanne Barr as other stereotypical Jewish women. Madonna also lampooned herself by having her character attack Madonna as a bad example for teenage Jewish girls ("She's a tramp. Every week with the different boyfriend! And this week in the papers with no clothes on! Who needs her? Feh!!"), referring to the hitchhiking scene from Madonna's "Erotica" video. They discussed Streisand's film The Prince of Tides (1991) on the show.

Near the end of the sketch, the women compared Streisand to "buttah"and suddenly, a voice announced, "All this talk about food, I'm getting hungry, girls." It was Streisand herself in a surprise appearance; none of the actors had any idea that she was to appear. All three managed to remain in character as the audience went wild. (Myers as Richman screamed, "I can die now! That's all the time we have for this week; I have to go and die now!") The real Richman, sitting in the audience that night to watch her then son-in-law lampoon her, has acknowledged having been "tickled to death" at that particular moment, as Streisand is one of her actual heroes as well.

Streisand only stayed long enough to give each character a kiss and wave to the audience. Streisand later revealed that she had been giving a performance at Radio City Music Hall (which is located across West 50th Street from NBC Studios) and happened to overhear that the sketch was being done that night. In the television special Saturday Night Live: 101 Most Unforgettable Moments, this particular sketch is moment number six.

Call-ins
Richman would occasionally take callers. The number to call was always 555-4444, each "four" again said with the same accent (though, in some later airings, the 555 is bleeped out and covered up on screen, as 555-4444 is no longer a fictitious telephone number). "Give a call, we'll talk, no big whoop."

Mannerisms
Richman occasionally added Yiddish or pseudo-Yiddish words into her speech: "OK now, this show used to be hosted by my friend Paul Baldwin, but he developed shpilkis in his genechtagazoink. So now he's in Boca Raton, Florida, recovering nicely, thank you very much." The catchphrase often used to describe things Linda admired was "like butter", which in the accent becomes "like buttah". A typical example is, "Her voice, it's like buttah."

Discussion topics
Whenever Richman would get upset, she would put her hand on her chest and say "I'm all ferklempt" or "I'm a little ferklempt." Then she would say, "Talk amongst yourselves," sometimes waving her hand in a dismissive gesture toward the audience. She would often follow this with an example by saying, "I'll give you a topic," which would typically have the structure of a bahuvrihi: "[two- or three-part phrase] is neither [first part], nor [second part] (nor [third part]). Discuss."  Richman would then recover after a beat.

Examples:

"Dr. Pepper were neither a doctor, nor a pepper.  Discuss."
"The Partridge Family were neither partridges, nor a family.  Discuss."
"Milli Vanilli is neither a Milli or a Vanilli. Discuss."
"The Romanesque Church design was based on the Roman Basilica. Discuss."
"Palmoliveit's neither palm, nor olive. Discuss."
"Grape-Nutsit contains neither grapes, nor nuts. Discuss."
"The Civil War was neither civil nor a war. Discuss."
"The radical reconstruction of the South after the Civil War was neither radical nor a reconstruction. Discuss."
"The Holy Roman Empire was neither holy nor Roman nor an empire. Discuss." (This quote is based on a famous comment by Voltaire.)
"Jamaican Joe was neither Jamaican, nor named Joe. Discuss."
"The peanut is neither a pea nor a nut. Discuss."
"Ralph Fiennes is spelled neither rafe nor fines. Discuss."
"Duran Duran is neither a Duran nor a Duran. Discuss."
"Rhode Island is neither a road nor is it an island. Discuss."
"The Thighmaster is neither a thigh nor a master. Discuss."
"The Progressive Era was neither progressive nor an era. Discuss."
"Did Truman drop the atomic bomb to defeat the Japanese or to scare the Russians? Discuss."
"The Mormon Tabernacle Choir is neither Mormon nor a tabernacle nor a choir. Discuss."
"The New Deal was neither new nor was it a deal. Discuss."
"The chickpea is neither a chick nor a pea. Discuss."
"Transitional Romanesque architecture was neither transitional nor Romanesque. Discuss."
"The internal combustion engine was neither internal nor combustion. Discuss."
"The jelly bean is neither made of jelly nor is it a bean. Discuss."
"The Italian neo realist movement in film was neither Italian nor neo nor particularly realist. Discuss."
"The Industrial Revolution was neither Industrial nor a Revolution. Discuss."

Ethnic and religious references
Richman would also make light jokes and good-natured ribbing about people raised in interfaith families, such as: someone who came from a family with Methodist and Jewish parents is called a "Mu Shu", whereas people who came from families with Jewish and Roman Catholic parents were called "cashews". In one of the final episodes of the sketch, Richman is shown with an Irish-Catholic boyfriend, who is a retired NYPD officer (played by Charlton Heston). When the boyfriend proposes marriage to her, Richman acts stunned, which prompts tremendous cheering from the female audience members.

Cultural references
The Fran Drescher sitcom The Nanny (1993–1999) made a direct tongue-in-cheek reference to the Richman sketches by showing brunette Fran Fine (Drescher), her blonde mother (Renée Taylor) and gray-haired grandma Yetta (Ann Guilbert) on the couch watching their respective "Coffee Talk" counterparts (Myers', Madonna's, and Roseanne Barr's characters) on television, all very similar in their appearance, voice and mannerisms. While fussing over their big hair in the fashion of the "Coffee Talk" regulars, they complain that the sketch is "so stereotypical".

The Richman character was inspired by Myers' then real-life mother-in-law, a woman of New York Jewish heritage who is actually named Linda Richman. During a Larry King interview of Myers, the real Richman called in and expressed good-natured amusement about the character. During his appearance on Inside the Actors Studio, he claimed that his impression for the character was "underplayed" and that his mother-in-law actually goaded him into performing the voice of the character when they were in public together.

Myers made an appearance as Richman during Streisand's '93/'94 New Year's Eve concert at the MGM Grand Las Vegas. While Streisand discussed reporting made in The New York Times, Richman was heard from the audience assuring Streisand to ignore such press ("Don't listen to that woman, Barbra; what does she know? Please! Feh!"). Streisand then invited Richman up on stage, and they performed a comedy skit lampooning the Coffee Talk discussion topics. (Streisand: "Now, I'm getting ferklempt! [To audience:] Talk amongst yourselves. I'll give you a topic: The Prince of Tides was about neither a prince nor tidesDiscuss.")

See also

 Recurring Saturday Night Live characters and sketches introduced 1990-91

References

External links
Coffee Talk Script from the October 12, 1991, episode that introduces Linda Richman.
 

Mass media franchises introduced in 1991
Cultural depictions of Barbra Streisand
Fictional television shows
Stereotypes of Jewish people
Stereotypes of women
Jewish comedy and humor
Saturday Night Live sketches
Saturday Night Live in the 1990s
Works by Mike Myers